Sebastian "Basti" Lindholm (born 30 January 1961 in Helsinki) is a rally driver from Finland. He is a cousin of Marcus Grönholm. Lindholm has won the Finnish Rally Championship eight times; 1990, 1993, 1995, 2000, 2002, 2003, 2004 and 2006.

Lindholm has also competed in 37 World Rally Championship events. His best result is fourth at the 1997 Rally Finland, driving a Ford Escort WRC. In 2007, Lindholm drove Suzuki's SX 4 WRC in its gravel debut at the 2007 Rally GB.

On 19 July 2009, Lindholm was involved in a fatal accident in Estonia at Lõuna-Eesti Rally when he crashed on the fourth stage.

Complete WRC results

Notes

External links
sebateam.fi
profile in rallybase.nl

1961 births
Living people
Finnish rally drivers
Swedish-speaking Finns
World Rally Championship drivers
Sportspeople from Helsinki
Peugeot Sport drivers